Jari Pekka Ronkainen (born 28 May 1972 in Hollola) is a Finnish politician currently serving in the Parliament of Finland for the Finns Party at the Tavastia constituency.

References

1972 births
Living people
People from Hollola
Finns Party politicians
Members of the Parliament of Finland (2015–19)
Members of the Parliament of Finland (2019–23)